These are the official results of the Women's 400 metres event at the 2003 IAAF World Championships in Paris, France. There were a total number of 37 participating athletes, with five qualifying heats, three semi-finals and the final held on Wednesday 27 August 2003 at 21:50h.

Final

Semi-final
Held on Monday 25 August 2003

Heats
Held on Sunday 24 August 2003

References
 

H
400 metres at the World Athletics Championships
2003 in women's athletics